Cambarus fasciatus, the Etowah crayfish, is a species of crayfish in the family Cambaridae. It is endemic to Georgia.

References

Further reading

 
 
 

Cambaridae
Articles created by Qbugbot
Crustaceans described in 1981
Freshwater crustaceans of North America
Endemic fauna of Georgia (U.S. state)
Taxa named by Horton H. Hobbs Jr.